The Senegal FA Cup is the top knock-out tournament in Senegalese football. It was created in 1961. The current champion is Niarry-Tally who won their only title in 2016 and compete in League 1 of the Senegalese football pyramid. ASC Diaraf have won the most cup titles (15), most recently in 2013 against Casa Sports, 2 - 1 aet. Since 1977, the winner competes in the Senegalese Super Cup (formerly the Assemblée Nationale Cup), the super cup of Senegalese football against the national league champion. If the national league champion also wins the FA cup then the second place club in league 1 competes. The winner of the FA cup qualifies for the continental CAF Confederation Cup.

Title history
Espoir de Saint-Louis from the northwest of Senegal was the first cup winner in 1961, a club today a part of ASC Linguère. ASC Jeanne d'Arc was the second winner and the first from Dakar. US Rail was their third, followed by Ouakam and US Gorée, from the Dakar area. AS Saint-Louisienne (also now part of ASC Linguère) won their second title. Foyer France won two consecutive cup titles and the only time under that name in 1967 and 1968. Jeanne d'Arc won their second in 1969. A club from Dakar won their third title in 1970 and the first as ASC Diaraf. After the merger of Espoir de Saint-Louis and AS Saint-Louisienne, the club won their first title in 1971 as ASC Linguère. Gorée, Diaraf, and Jeanne d'Arc won more cup titles in four years. AS Polce became the next club to win a title in 1976. Saltiques Rufisque from metro Dakar won in 1977, Police win their second in 1978. The first club from the southwest of Senegal, Casa Sport won their first title ijn 1979..  Jeanne d'Arc won in 1980. Police won in 1981, Diaraf in 1982 and 1983, Jeanne d'Arc in 1984, Daraf again in 1985.  The next club to win a first title was Douanes in 1986.  Jeanne d'Arc and Linguère were the next winners.  Ouakam won their next title in 25 years in 1989.  Linguère, Diaraf and Gorée won their next titles, in 1995, Diaraf won three consecutive cup titles.  Gorée and Douanes won their next titles afterwards.  Yeggo won their only title in 2000, later Ndiambour, Port Autonome and Djourbel (SONACOS, now SUNEOR) won their only titles.  Douanes won four consecutive in 2005.  Ouakam, Linguére and Diaraf were its next winners, the latter won two consecutive in 2009.  Toure Kounda won their only title in 2010.  in 32 years, Casa Sport won their next title.  HLM won their only title in 2012.  Diaraf won their last title won in 2013.  Pikine, Génération Foot and Niarry-Tally won their only titles afterwards.  All cup winners are from the west of Senegal.

Winners

Performance By Club

Notes

See also 

 List of association football competitions

References

Football competitions in Senegal
National association football cups
Recurring sporting events established in 1961